Procurement outsourcing is the transfer of specified key procurement activities relating to sourcing and supplier management to a third party — perhaps to reduce overall costs or maybe to tighten the company's focus on its core competencies. Procurement categorisation and vendor management of indirect materials and services (commonly referred to as Indirect procurement) are typically the most popular outsourced activity.

Overview

Outsourced procurement teams allow companies to benefit immediately from experienced procurement specialists support & expertise. This avoids the creation of an internal team (new resources) and the required time for that team to structure itself, its processes and its expertise.

Outsourced procurement is therefore an available solution for companies who Have no internal competencies but want to quickly benefit from procurement action (Cost reduction, suppliers and contract management...
)
- Have internal procurement expertise (department) but want to outsource activity on specific area(s) like indirect materials and services.
- Consider Procurement as a non strategic / core function and want to have it managed by a procurement service provider
- Want to develop quickly a procurement function to deliver savings, with a willingness to internally develop this function in the mid term

Procurement Outsourcing is being thought of in a big way in automobile manufacturers in India and China because with increasing number of cars being produced every passing day more man hours are required in trivial issues like timely delivery of materials. Hence Procurement team cannot concentrate on its core competency of negotiations and vendor selections.

Procurement categories
Procurement specialists usually split procurement activities into two parts:
 Direct procurement. Direct categories are all goods purchased by the company which directly enter into the production process of that company. For the food industry as an example, ingredients and packaging will be the key direct procurement categories.
 Indirect Procurement. Indirect categories are all the goods and services that are bought by the company to enable its activity. This entails a wide scope, including marketing related services (media buying, agencies), IT related services (hardware, software), HR related services (recruitment agencies, training), facilities management and office services (Telecoms, furniture, cleaning, catering, printers), or utilities (gas, electricity, water)...etc.

Procurement services providers (PSP)
Specialized procurement service providers are dedicated to procurement and have developed a strong expertise in procurement and procurement outsourcing, mainly in indirect procurement. Additionally, several consulting companies offer procurement outsourcing services in a limited manner, mainly focusing on strategic inputs or recommendations. Procurement services providers will usually ask for a fixed remuneration against commitment to saving delivery. Some providers also work on incentives or performance related fees (% of savings). Apart from procurement outsourcing, PSPs will offer other services like spend analysis or opportunity assessments.

References

Procurement